Leslie Royston Johnson AM (22 November 1924 – 26 May 2015) was an Australian politician. He was a member of the Australian Labor Party (ALP) and held ministerial office in the Whitlam Government, serving as Minister for Housing (1972–1973), Works (1973), Housing and Construction (1973–1975), and Aboriginal Affairs (1975). He represented the Division of Hughes in New South Wales from 1955 to 1966 and from 1969 to 1983. He later served as High Commissioner to New Zealand from 1984 to 1985, cutting short his term due to his daughter's ill health.

Early life
Johnson was born at Enfield, New South Wales on 22 November 1924. He initially worked as a boilermaker's mate before becoming an apprentice fitter and turner. He became active in the Amalgamated Engineering Union, serving as chair of its New South Wales Youth Committee. He later worked as an organiser for the Federated Clerks Union and ran a general store and newsagency at Gymea.

Politics

Johnson was elected for the Australian Labor Party as the first member for the newly created House of Representatives seat of Hughes at the 1955 election. He held it until his defeat at the 1966 election by Liberal Don Dobie.  However, a redistribution ahead of the 1969 election shifted most of the wealthier portions of Hughes to the newly created seat of Division of Cook. The reconfigured Hughes now had a notional Labor majority of eight percent, making it a fairly safe Labor seat on paper.  Believing this made Hughes impossible to hold, especially with Johnson priming for a rematch, Dobie transferred to Cook.  This proved prescient, as Johnson retook the seat on a large swing while Dobie narrowly won Cook. Johnson would hold Hughes without serious difficulty until 1983.

Following Labor's win at the December 1972 election, he was appointed to the Whitlam ministry as Minister for Housing. In October 1973, he was appointed to the additional portfolio of Works. In November the two portfolios were combined as Housing and Construction. In June 1975 he was moved to the Minister for Aboriginal Affairs. He lost this position as a result of the dismissal of the Whitlam Government in November 1975. He subsequently became the Opposition Whip.

Labor returned to government at the March 1983 election, but Johnson did not stand for a place in the ministry. However, he was elected chairman of committees. He resigned from parliament in December 1983 so that he could become Australian High Commissioner to New Zealand. His position as High Commissioner was cut short following the serious illness of his daughter, Sally Anne Penman, who was diagnosed with breast cancer, and subsequently died in February 1988.

Personal life
Les Johnson married Gladys (Peg) Jones in 1947, and she died in 2002. They had three children, Grant, Sally (deceased) and Jenny. In 2003 Les Johnson married Marion Sharkey, and they lived at Shoal Bay, NSW.

Johnson was made a Member of the Order of Australia (AM) in June 1990. He died on 26 May 2015, aged 90.

References 

1924 births
1975 Australian constitutional crisis
2015 deaths
20th-century Australian politicians
Australian Labor Party members of the Parliament of Australia
High Commissioners of Australia to New Zealand
Members of the Australian House of Representatives for Hughes
Members of the Australian House of Representatives
Members of the Cabinet of Australia
Members of the Order of Australia
People from the Sutherland Shire